Ignacy Jan Paderewski ( – 29 June 1941) was a Polish pianist, composer and politician who was a spokesman for Polish independence. In 1919, he was the nation's prime minister and foreign minister during which he signed the Treaty of Versailles, which ended World War I.

A favorite of concert audiences around the world, his musical fame opened access to diplomacy and the media, as possibly did his status as a freemason, and charitable work of his second wife, Helena Paderewska. During World War I, Paderewski advocated an independent Poland, including by touring the United States, where he met with President Woodrow Wilson, who came to support the creation of an independent Poland in his Fourteen Points at the Paris Peace Conference in 1919, which led to the Treaty of Versailles.

Shortly after his resignations from office, Paderewski resumed his concert career to recoup his finances and rarely visited the politically chaotic Poland thereafter, the last time being in 1924.

Early life, marriage and education
Paderewski was born to Polish parents in the village of Kurilovka, in the Podolia Governorate of the Russian Empire. The village is now part of the Khmilnyk raion of Vinnytsia Oblast in Ukraine. His father, Jan Paderewski, administered large estates. His mother, Poliksena, née Nowicka, died several months after Paderewski was born, and he was raised mostly by distant relatives.

From his early childhood, Paderewski was interested in music. He initially lived at a private estate near Zhytomyr, where he moved with his father. However, soon after his father's arrest in connection with the January Uprising (1863), he was adopted by his aunt. After being released, Paderewski's father married again and moved to the town of Sudylkov, near Shepetovka.

Initially, Paderewski took piano lessons with a private tutor. At the age of 12, in 1872, he went to Warsaw and was admitted to the Warsaw Conservatory. Upon graduating in 1878, he became a tutor of piano classes at his alma mater. In 1880, Paderewski married a fellow student at the conservatory, Antonina Korsakówna. The next year, their son Alfred was born severely handicapped. Antonina never recovered from childbirth and died several weeks later. Paderewski decided to devote himself to music and left his son in the care of friends, and in 1881, he went to Berlin to study music composition with Friedrich Kiel and Heinrich Urban.

A chance meeting in 1884 with a famous Polish actress, Helena Modrzejewska, began his career as a virtuoso pianist. Modrzejewska arranged for a public concert and joint appearance in Kraków's Hotel Saski to raise funds for Paderewski's further piano study. The scheme was a tremendous success, and Paderewski soon moved to Vienna, where he studied with Theodor Leschetizky (Teodor Leszetycki). He married his second wife, Helena Paderewska (née von Rosen, 1856–1934), shortly after she received an annulment of a prior marriage, on 31 May 1899. While she had previously cared for his son Alfred (1880–1901), they had no children together.

Pianist, composer and supporter of new composers

After three years of diligent study and a teaching appointment in Strasbourg which Leschetizky arranged, Paderewski made his concert debut in Vienna in 1887. He soon gained great popularity and had popular successes in Paris in 1889 and in London in 1890. Audiences responded to his brilliant playing with almost extravagant displays of admiration, and Paderewski also gained access to the halls of power. In 1891, Paderewski repeated his triumphs on an American tour; he would tour the country more than 30 times for the next five decades, and it would become his second home. His stage presence, striking looks, and immense charisma contributed to his stage success, which later proved important in his political and charitable activities. His name became synonymous with the highest level of piano virtuosity. Not everyone was equally impressed, however. After hearing Paderewski for the first time, when Paderewski was exhausted from his American tour, Moriz Rosenthal quipped, "Yes, he plays well, I suppose, but he's no Paderewski."

Paderewski kept up a furious pace of touring and composition, including many of his own piano compositions in his concerts. He also wrote an opera, Manru, which is still the only opera by a Polish composer that was ever performed in the Metropolitan Opera's 135-year history. A "lyric drama," Manru is an ambitious work that was formally inspired by Wagner's music dramas. It lacks an overture and closed-form arias but uses Wagner's device of leitmotifs to represent characters and ideas. The story centres on a doomed love triangle, social inequality, and racial prejudice (Manru is a Gypsy), and it is set in the Tatra Mountains. In addition to the Met, Manru was staged in Dresden (a private royal viewing), Lviv (its official premiere in 1901), Prague, Cologne, Zurich, Warsaw, Philadelphia, Boston, Chicago, Pittsburgh and Baltimore, Moscow, and Kiev. In 1904, Paderewski, accompanied by his second wife, entourage, parrot, and Erard piano, gave concerts in Australia and New Zealand in collaboration with Polish-French composer, Henri Kowalski. Paderewski toured tirelessly around the world and was the first to give a solo performance at the new 3,000-seat Carnegie Hall. In 1909 came the premiere of his Symphony in B minor "Polonia", a massive work lasting 75 minutes. Paderewski's compositions were quite popular in his lifetime and, for a time, entered the orchestral repertoire, particularly his Fantaisie polonaise sur des thèmes originaux (Polish Fantasy on Original Themes) for piano and orchestra, Piano Concerto in A minor, and Polonia symphony. His piano miniatures became especially popular; the Minuet in G major, Op. 14 No. 1, written in the style of Mozart, became one of the most recognized piano tunes of all time. Despite his relentless touring schedule and his political and charitable engagements, Paderewski left a legacy of over 70 orchestral, instrumental, and vocal works.

All of his works evoke a romantic image of Poland. They incorporate references to Polish dances (polonaise, krakowiak, and mazurka) and highlander music (Tatra album [Album tatrzańskie], op. 12, Polish Dances [Tańce polskie], op. 5). Paderewski's love of his country is reflected in the titles of his compositions (Polish Fantasy [Fantazja polska], op. 19 and Symphony in B Minor "Polonia," which includes a quote from Dąbrowski's Mazurka [Mazurek Dąbrowskiego]), themes (Manru), and musical settings of quotes from Polish poets (e.g., Asnyk and Mickiewicz).

Philanthropy 

In 1896, Paderewski donated US$10,000 to establish a trust fund to encourage American-born composers. The fund underwrote a triennial competition that began in 1901, the Paderewski Prize. Paderewski also launched a similar contest in Leipzig in 1898. He was so popular internationally that the music hall duo "The Two Bobs" had a hit song in 1916 in music halls across Britain with the song "When Paderewski Plays". He was a favorite of concert audiences around the globe; women especially admired his performances.

By the turn of the century, the artist was an extremely wealthy man generously donating to numerous causes and charities and sponsoring monuments, among them the Washington Arch, in New York, in 1892. Paderewski shared his fortune generously with fellow countrymen, as well as with citizens and foundations from around the world. He established a foundation for young American musicians and the students of Stanford University (1896), another at the Parisian Conservatory (1909), yet another scholarship fund at the Ecole Normale (1924), funded students of the Moscow Conservatory and the Saint Petersburg Conservatory (1899) as well as spas in the Alps (1928), for the British Legion. In the Great Depression, Paderewski supported unemployed musicians in the United States (1932) and the unemployed in Switzerland in 1937. Paderewski also publicly supported an insurance fund for musicians in London (1933) and aided Jewish intellectuals in Paris (1933). He also supported orphanages and the Maternity Centre in New York. Only a few of the Paderewski-sponsored concert halls and monuments included Debussy (1931) and Édouard Colonne (1923) monuments in Paris, Liszt Monument in Weimar, Beethoven Monument in Bonn, Chopin Monument in Żelazowa Wola (the composer's birthplace), Kosciuszko Monument in Chicago, and Washington Arch in New York.

California
In 1913, Paderewski settled in the United States. On the eve of World War I and at the height of his fame, Paderewski bought a 2,000-acre (810-ha) property, Rancho San Ignacio, near Paso Robles, in San Luis Obispo County, in California's Central Coast region. A decade later, he planted Zinfandel vines on the Californian property. When the vines matured, the grapes were processed into wine at the nearby York Mountain Winery, which was, as it still is, one of the best-known wineries between Los Angeles and San Francisco.

Politician and diplomat
In 1910, Paderewski funded the Grunwald Monument in Kraków to commemorate the 500th anniversary of the Battle of Grunwald. The monument's unveiling led to great patriotic demonstrations. In speaking to the gathered throng, Paderewski proved as adept at capturing their hearts and minds for the political cause as he was with his music. His passionate delivery needed no recourse to notes. Paderewski's status as an artist and philanthropist and not as a member of any of the many Polish political factions became one of his greatest assets and so he rose above the quarrels, and he could legitimately appeal to higher ideals of unity, sacrifice, charity, and work for common goals.

In World War I, Paderewski became an active member of the Polish National Committee in Paris, which was soon accepted by the Triple Entente as the representative of the forces trying to create the state of Poland. Paderewski became the committee's spokesman, and soon, he and his wife also formed others, including the Polish Relief Fund, in London, and the White Cross Society, in the United States. Paderewski met the English composer Edward Elgar, who used a theme from Paderewski's Fantasie Polonaise in his work Polonia written for the Polish Relief Fund concert in London on 6 July 1916 (the title certainly recognises Paderewski's Symphony in B minor).

Paderewski urged fellow Polish immigrants to join the Polish armed forces in France, and he pressed elbows with all the dignitaries and influential men whose salons he could enter. He spoke to Americans directly in public speeches and on the radio by appealing to them to remember the fate of his nation. He kept such a demanding schedule of public appearances, fundraisers, and meetings that he stopped musical touring altogether for a few years, instead dedicating himself to diplomatic activity. On the eve of the American entry into the war, in January 1917, US President Woodrow Wilson's main advisor, Colonel House, turned to Paderewski to prepare a memorandum on the Polish issue. Two weeks later, Wilson spoke before Congress and issued a challenge to the status quo: "I take it for granted that statesmen everywhere are agreed that there should be a united, independent, autonomous Poland." The establishment of "New Poland" became one of Wilson's famous Fourteen Points, the principles that Wilson followed during peace negotiations to end World War I. In April 1918, Paderewski met in New York City with leaders of the American Jewish Committee in an unsuccessful attempt to broker a deal in which organised Jewish groups would support Polish territorial ambitions, in exchange for support for equal rights. However, it soon became clear that no plan would satisfy both Jewish leaders and Roman Dmowski, the head of the Polish National Committee, who was strongly anti-Semitic.

At the end of the war, with the fate of the city of Poznań and the whole region of Greater Poland (Wielkopolska) still undecided, Paderewski visited Poznań. Following his public speech there on 27 December 1918, the Polish inhabitants of the city began a military uprising against Germany, the Greater Poland Uprising.

In 1919, in the newly independent Poland, Piłsudski, who was the Chief of State, appointed Paderewski as the Prime Minister of Poland and the Minister of Foreign Affairs of Poland (January 1919 – December 1919). He and Dmowski represented Poland at the 1919 Paris Peace Conference and dealt with issues regarding territorial claims and minority rights. He signed the Treaty of Versailles, which recognized Polish independence won after World War I. Paderewski's period in government had some achievements during its ten months: democratic elections to Parliament, ratification of the Treaty of Versailles, legislation on protection of ethnic minorities in the new state, and the establishment of a public education system. But Paderewski "proved to be a poor administrator and worse politician" and resigned from the Government in December 1919, having received criticism for his perceived submissiveness to the Western powers. After his resignation, Paderewski continued to represent Poland abroad in 1920 at the request of his successor as Prime Minister, Władysław Grabski, at the Spa Conference, when Poland was threatened by the Polish-Soviet War; however Piłsudski's success at the Battle of Warsaw later that year made these negotiations redundant, and put to an end Paderewski's hopes of regaining office.

Return to music
In 1922, Paderewski retired from politics and returned to his musical life. His first concert after a long break, held at Carnegie Hall, was a significant success. He also filled Madison Square Garden (20,000 seats) and toured the United States in a private railway car.

In 1897, Paderewski had bought the manor house of the former Duchess of Otrante near Morges, Switzerland, where he rested between concert tours. After Piłsudski's coup d'état in 1926, Paderewski became an active member of the opposition to Sanacja rule. In 1936, two years after his second wife's death at their Swiss home, a coalition of members of the opposition met in the mansion and was nicknamed the Front Morges after the village.

By 1936, Paderewski agreed to appear in a film that presented his talent and art. Although the proposal had come while the mourning Paderewski avoided public appearances, the film project went ahead. It became notable, primarily, for its rare footage of his piano performance. The exiled German-born director Lothar Mendes directed the feature, which was released in Britain as Moonlight Sonata in 1937 and re-titled The Charmer for US distribution in 1943.

In November 1937, Paderewski agreed to take on one last piano student. The musician was Witold Małcużyński, who had won third place at the International Chopin Piano Competition.

Return to public life
After the invasion of Poland in 1939, Paderewski returned to public life. In 1940, he became the head of the National Council of Poland, a Polish sejm (parliament) in exile in London. He again turned to America for help and his broadcast was carried by over 100 radio stations in the United States and Canada. He advocated in person for European aid and to defeat Nazism. In 1941, Paderewski witnessed a touching tribute to his artistry and humanitarianism as US cities celebrated the 50th anniversary of his first American tour by putting on a Paderewski Week, with over 6000 concerts in his honour. The 80-year-old artist also restarted his Polish Relief Fund and gave several concerts to gather money for it. However, his mind was not what it had once been, and scheduled again to play Madison Square Garden, he refused to appear and insisted that he had already played the concert; he was presumably remembering the concert he had played there in the 1920s.

Death and legacy
Paderewski fell ill on tour on 27 June 1941. Sylwin Strakacz bypassed his secretary and other tour personnel to summon physicians, who diagnosed pneumonia. Despite signs of improving health and recovery, Paderewski died in New York at 11:00 p.m., 29 June, at 80. He was temporarily laid in repose in the crypt of the USS Maine Mast Memorial at Arlington National Cemetery, in Arlington, Virginia, near Washington, DC, despite anecdotal accounts that he wished to be buried near his second wife and son in France. In 1992, after the end of communism in Poland, his remains were transferred to Warsaw and placed in St. John's Archcathedral. His heart is encased in a bronze sculpture in the National Shrine of Our Lady of Czestochowa near Doylestown, Pennsylvania.

In early 1941, the music publisher Boosey & Hawkes had commissioned 17 prominent composers to contribute a solo piano piece each for an album to commemorate the 50th anniversary of Paderewski's American debut in 1891. It became a posthumous tribute to Paderewski's entire life and work, Homage to Paderewski (1942). Also, Helena Paderewska had prepared a memoir of her husband's political activities between 1910 and 1920, whose typescript was not published in either of their lifetimes but was discovered by an archivist at the Hoover Institution in 2015 and then published.

Museum displays
The Polish Museum of America in Chicago received a donation of his personal possessions after his death in June 1941. Both Ignacy Paderewski and his sister, Antonina Paderewska Wilkonska were enthusiastic supporters and generous sponsors of the Museum. Antonina, executor of Ignacy's will, decided to donate the personal possessions to the Museum, as well as artifacts from his apartment in New York. The space was officially opened on 3 November 1941. Another museum in his honour exists at Morges, Switzerland, although Paderewski's mansion was razed in 1965.

Memorials and tributes
 

In 1948, the Ignacy Paderewski Foundation was established in New York City, on the initiative of the Polish community there with the goal of promoting Polish culture in the United States. Two other Polish-American organizations are also named in his honour and are dedicated to promoting the legacy of the maestro: the Paderewski Association in Chicago as well as the Paderewski Music Society in Southern California.

In the Irving Berlin song, "I Love a Piano", recorded in 1916 by Billy Murray, the narrator says:
 
"And with the pedal, I love to meddle/When Paderewski comes this way./I'm so delighted, when I'm invited/To hear that long-haired genius play."

His unusual combination of being a world-class pianist and successful politician made Saul Kripke use Paderewski in a famous philosophical example in his article "A Puzzle about Belief." Paderewski was so famous that in the 1953 motion picture The 5,000 Fingers of Dr. T, written by Theodor Seuss Geisel, better known as Dr. Seuss, piano teacher Terwilliker tells his pupils that he will "make a Paderewski" out of them.

Two music festivals honouring Paderewski are celebrated in the United States, both in November. The first Paderewski Festival has been held each year since 1993, in Paso Robles, California. The second Paderewski Festival – Raleigh has been held since 2014 in Raleigh, North Carolina.

The facade of White Eagle Hall, in Jersey City, New Jersey, is adorned with busts of Polish heroes Ignacy Jan Paderewski, Casimir Pulaski, Tadeusz Kosciuszko and Henryk Sienkiewicz.

Honours and awards

The Academy of Music in Poznań is named after Paderewski, and many major cities in Poland have streets and schools named after Paderewski. Streets are also named after him in Perth Amboy, New Jersey, and Buffalo, New York. In addition, since 1960 Paderewski has a star on the Hollywood Walk of Fame in Los Angeles.

 Order of the White Eagle (Poland, 1921)
 Order of Virtuti Militari, Silver Cross (posthumous) (Poland, 1941)
 Order of Polonia Restituta, Grand Cross (Poland, 1923) 
 Legion of Honour, Grand Cross, (France, 1929) 
 Order of the Crown, (Romania, 1889)
 Albert Order, (Saxony, 1895)
 Order of Saints Maurice and Lazarus (Italy, 1925) 
 Order of the Crown of Italy
 Order of Charles III, (Spain, 1902) 
 Order of Leopold, (Belgium, 1924)
 Honorary Knight Grand Cross of the Order of the British Empire (British Empire, 1925)
 Honorary doctorates from the Lviv University (1912), Yale University (1917), Jagiellonian University (1919), Oxford University (1920), Columbia University (1922), University of Southern California (1923), Adam Mickiewicz University in Poznań (1924), University of Glasgow (1925), Cambridge University (1926), University of Warsaw (1931), the University of Lausanne (1933), and the New York University
 Honorary Citizen of Lviv, 1912
 Honorary Citizen of Warsaw, 1919
 Honorary Citizen of Poznań, 1920
 Honorary Studentenverbindung Patria
 Royal Philharmonic Society Gold Medal
 Academic Golden Laurel of the Polish Academy of Literature for oratory
 Honorary member of the Royal Academy of Music, (British Empire, 1892)
On 8 October 1960, the United States Post Office Department released two stamps commemorating Ignacy Jan Paderewski. Poland also honored him with postage stamps on at least three occasions.

See also
History of Poland (1918–1939)
List of Polish composers
List of Poles

References

 Biskupski, M. B. "Paderewski, Polish Politics, and the Battle of Warsaw, 1920," Slavic Review (1987) 46#3 pp. 503–512 in JSTOR
 Chavez, Melissa, "Paderewski – From Poland to Paso Robles (California): Paderewski's dream returns". Paso Robles Magazine, September 2007
 Lawton, Mary. Editor. The Paderewski Memoirs. London, Collins, 1939
 Marczewska-Zagdanska, Hanna; Dorosz, Janina. "Wilson – Paderewski – Masaryk: Their Visions of Independence and Conceptions of how to Organize Europe," Acta Poloniae Historica (1996), Issue 73, pp 55–69.
 Riff, Michael, The Face of Survival: Jewish Life in Eastern Europe Past and Present. Valentine Mitchell, London, 1992, .
 Sachs, Harvey. Virtuoso: The Life and Art of Niccolò Paganini, Franz Liszt, Anton Rubinstein, Ignace Jan Paderewski, Fritz Kreisler (1982) 
 Strakacz, Aniela. Paderewski as I Knew Him. (transl. by Halina Chybowska). New Brunswick, Rutgers University Press, 1949
 
 Zamoyski, Adam. Paderewski (1982)

External links

Paderewski Festival in Paso Robles, California
 
complete list of works, with dates of composition and publication
  Fundacja Kultury im. Ignacego Jana Paderewskiego
 An article about J.I. Paderewski by Lt. Gen. Edward Rowny
 Paderewski Music Society in Los Angeles
 The Paderewski Association

J.I. Paderewski Chamber Orchestra
J.I. Paderewski Tarnów Estate – Kasna Dolna
J.I. Paderewski International Piano Competition
J.I. Paderewski Youth Classical Piano Competition in Paso Robles, California
Tempo Rubato – Chapter contributed to Henry T. Finck's book Success in music and how it is won (1909)
Six recordings by Paderewski in digital restorations to play or download
 
 Ignace Jan Paderewski recordings at the Discography of American Historical Recordings.
 Works by Ignacy Paderewski in National Digital Library of Poland (Polona)

1860 births
1941 deaths
19th-century classical composers
19th-century classical pianists
19th-century male musicians
20th-century classical composers
20th-century classical pianists
20th-century male musicians
Polish Romantic composers
Polish male classical composers
Polish classical pianists
Polish music educators
Composers for piano
Male classical pianists
Piano pedagogues
Prime Ministers of Poland
Ministers of Foreign Affairs of the Second Polish Republic
Members of the Polish National Committee (1917–1919)
Permanent Representatives of Poland to the League of Nations
Clan of Jelita
Polish independence activists
Composers awarded knighthoods
Musicians awarded knighthoods
Recipients of the Legion of Honour
Honorary Knights Grand Cross of the Order of the British Empire
Recipients of the Silver Cross of the Virtuti Militari
Golden Laurel of the Polish Academy of Literature
Members of the Royal Academy of Belgium
Honorary Members of the Royal Philharmonic Society
Royal Philharmonic Society Gold Medallists
Chopin University of Music alumni
People from the Russian Empire of Polish descent
People from Vinnytsia Oblast
People from Litinsky Uyezd
People from Paso Robles, California
Deaths from pneumonia in New York City
Burials at Arlington National Cemetery
Burials at St. John's Archcathedral, Warsaw
Pupils of Theodor Leschetizky
Recipients of the Order of the White Eagle (Poland)
Polish opera composers